Nessia sarasinorum, commonly known as Sarasins's snake skink or Müller's nessia, is a species of lizard in the family Scincidae. The species is endemic to the island of Sri Lanka.

Etymology
The specific name, sarasinorum, is in honor of Swiss zoologists Karl Friedrich Sarasin and Paul Benedict Sarasin, who were cousins.

Habitat and distribution
A dry zone skink, N. sarasinorum is known in Sri Lanka from Maha Oya, Lahugala Kitulana National Park, Polgahawela, Polonnaruwa, Galigamuwa, Buttala, Inamaluwa, Dambulla, Kandalama, and Batticaloa.

Description
The body of N. sarasinorum is slender and of equal girth, from head to tail. The snout is acute and short. The fronto-nasal is shorter and broader than the frontal. The lower eyelid is scaly. The midbody scale rows number 22. The pre-anals are distinctly enlarged. The anterior limbs missing, and each posterior limb is reduced to a bud. The dorsum is light brown or bluish gray. There are individual scales with darker patches. Ventrally, it is lighter.

Ecology and diet
N. sarasinorum inhabits moist loose soil or vegetation, such as tree roots.

References

Further reading
Boulenger GA (1890). The Fauna of British India, Including Ceylon and Burma. Reptilia and Batrachia. London: Secretary of State for India in Council. (Taylor and Francis, printers). xviii + 541 pp. (Acontias sarasinorum, p. 228).
Müller F (1889). "Sechster Nachtrag zum Katalog der herpetologischen Sammlung des Basler Museums ". Verhandlung der Naturforschender Gesellschaft in Basel 8: 685-705. (Acontias sarasinorum, new species, pp. 702–704). (in German).
Smith MA (1935). The Fauna of British India, Including Ceylon and Burma. Reptilia and Amphibia. Vol. II.—Sauria. London: Secretary of State for India in Council. (Taylor and Francis, printers). xiii + 440 pp. + Plate I + 2 maps. (Nessia sarasinorum, p. 360).

External links
https://web.archive.org/web/20140714145549/http://www.arkive.org/nessia/nessia-sarasinorum/image-G119905.html
https://www.gbif.org/species/5225306

Nessia
Reptiles of Sri Lanka
Reptiles described in 1889
Taxa named by Fritz Müller (doctor)